BCSL may refer to:

Bergen County Scholastic League, a New Jersey high school athletic league
Burlington County Scholastic League, a New Jersey high school athletic league
Black Clouds & Silver Linings, Dream Theater's 10th studio album released on June 23, 2009